DZUL (104.3 FM), broadcasting as 104.3 MY FM, is a radio station owned and operated Sea and Sky Broadcasting. Its studios are located inside the Sea and Sky College campus, MacArthur Highway, Brgy. Pagdaraoan, San Fernando, La Union, Philippines. It operates from 4:00 AM to 12:00 MN.

The station was formerly known as Spirit FM under the Diocese of San Fernando de La Union from 1990 to February 2012.

References

External Links
MY FM FB Page

College radio stations in the Philippines
Radio stations in La Union
Radio stations established in 1990